The first synod of Rouen is generally believed to have been held by Archbishop Saint-Ouen about 650. Sixteen of its decrees, one against simony, the others on liturgical and canonical matters, are still extant.

Later synods were presided over by:

Archbishop St. Ansbert some time between 689 and 693
Archbishop Mauger in 1048
the papal legate Hermanfrid of Sitten at Lisieux in 1055, at which Archbishop Mauger of Rouen was deposed for his loose morals
Archbishop Maurilius in 1055, which drew up a creed against Berengarius of Tours to be subscribed to by all newly elected bishops
Archbishop John of Bayeux, one in 1072 and two in 1074, urging ecclesiastical reforms
Archbishop William in 1096, at which the decrees of the Council of Clermont (1095) were proclaimed
Archbishop Goisfred in 1118, at which the papal legate Conrad asked the assembled prelates and princes to support Gelasius II against Emperor Henry V and his antipope, Burdinus (Gregory VIII)
the same Archbishop in 1119, and the cardinal legate Matthew of Albano, in 1128, to enforce clerical celibacy
Archbishop Gualterus in 1190, and the papal legate Robert de Courçon, in 1214 to urge clerical reform.

Other synods were held in 1223, 1231, 1278, 1313, 1321, 1335, 1342, 1445, and 1581. The synod held by Archbishop Jacques-Nicolas Colbert in 1699 condemned Fénelon's Maximes des Saints.

The last provincial synod was held by Archbishop Louis-Marie-Edmont Blanquart de Bailleul in 1830; for its Acts see Collectio Lacensis, IV, 513–36.

Notes

650
689
690
691
692
693
1048 in Europe
1055 in Europe
1072 in Europe
1074 in Europe
1096 in Europe
1118 in Europe
1119 in Europe
1128 in Europe
1190 in Europe
1214 in Europe
1223 in Europe
1231 in Europe
1278 in Europe
1313 in Europe
1321 in Europe
1335 in Europe
1342 in Europe
1445 in Europe
1581 in Christianity
1581 in France
1699 in Christianity
1699 in France
1830 in Christianity
1830 in France
7th-century church councils
11th-century Catholic Church councils
12th-century Catholic Church councils
13th-century Catholic Church councils
14th-century Catholic Church councils
15th-century Catholic Church councils
16th-century Catholic Church councils
17th-century Catholic Church councils
19th-century Catholic Church councils
Catholic Church councils held in France
Synod
1830 conferences
7th century in Francia
1040s in France
1050s in France
1070s in France
1090s in France
1110s in France
1120s in France
1190s in France
1210s in France
1220s in France
1230s in France
1270s in France
1310s in France
1320s in France
1330s in France
1340s in France
1440s in France
12th-century Christianity
Christianity in Francia